Noah Adams is an American broadcast journalist and author, known primarily since 1987 from National Public Radio.

Career 
A former co-host of the daily All Things Considered program, Adams is currently the contributing  correspondent at the network's National Desk. His books tend to document a full year in his life, specifically as that year relates to a particular passion or research project. He wrote and narrated a documentary called Father Cares: The Last of Jonestown in 1981, which earned him the Prix Italia, the Alfred I. duPont-Columbia University Award, and the Major Armstrong Award.

Adams was the host of the nationally syndicated Minnesota Public Radio variety show Good Evening, created in 1987 to replace A Prairie Home Companion after that show left the air.
  Good Evening ran for less than a year before being canceled; A Prairie Home Companion returned after a several-year hiatus.

Personal life 
Adams was born in Ashland, Kentucky. He is married to Neenah Ellis, and they live in Yellow Springs, Ohio.

Bibliography
 Saint Croix Notes: River Mornings, Radio Nights (1990)—A collection of Adams' essays.
 Noah Adams on "All Things Considered": A Radio Journal (1992)—Follows his work for NPR during the volatile news year of June 4, 1989 to June 4, 1990.
 Piano Lessons: Music, Love, and True Adventures (1997)—Documents his struggles and musings on learning how to play the piano at age 51.
 Far Appalachia: Following the New River North (2001)—Adams explores and researches the New River, in a journey from North Carolina to West Virginia.
 The Flyers: In Search of Wilbur and Orville Wright (2003)—Adams narrates the history of the Wright brothers' early aviation years by visiting the sites where history had been made.

References

External links
 Bio on NPR web site
 Book reviews

American essayists
American male essayists
American memoirists
American radio journalists
American radio reporters and correspondents
American male journalists
Living people
NPR personalities
People from Ashland, Kentucky
People from Yellow Springs, Ohio
Writers from Kentucky
Year of birth missing (living people)
Radio personalities from Kentucky
Journalists from Ohio